Christiane Goethals (born 29 July 1947) is a Belgian gymnast. She competed in five events at the 1968 Summer Olympics.

References

Belgisch kampioene 1964 - 1965 1967

Trofee Sportverdienste stad Brugge 1965

winnares kampen :
- Trier/'s Hertogenbosch / Brugge 1964 & 1965
- Berlijn / Belgie 1966
- Belgie / Engeland 1968

Deelneemster :
- E.K. Sofia 1965
- E.K. Amsterdam 1967
- W.K. Dormund 1966
- O.S. Mexico 1968

External links
 

1947 births
Living people
Belgian female artistic gymnasts
Olympic gymnasts of Belgium
Gymnasts at the 1968 Summer Olympics
Sportspeople from Bruges
20th-century Belgian women